The Bishop of Swindon is an episcopal title used by a suffragan bishop of the Church of England Diocese of Bristol, in the Province of Canterbury, England. The title takes its name after the town of Swindon in Wiltshire. The title of Bishop of Malmesbury was the precursor title, named after Malmesbury in Wiltshire; the See was erected under the Suffragans Nomination Act 1888 by Order in Council dated 25 July 1927.

List of bishops of Swindon

References

External links
 Crockford's Clerical Directory - Listings

 
Swindon